Drug den may refer to:

Cannabis Social Club
Crack house
Opium den

See also
Acid Tests
Rave